Mum or MUM may refer to:

Art, entertainment and media 
 múm, an Icelandic musical group
 Mum Jokmok, a Thai comedian
 Mum (TV series), UK
 Mum (film)
 M-U-M (Magic-Unity-Might) magazine

Science 
 Multifocal plane microscopy
 Maximal unique match

Universities 
 Monash University, Malaysia campus
 Maharishi University of Management, in the United States
 Muslim University of Morogoro in Tanzania

Other uses
 Mother, or mum in colloquial British and Commonwealth English
 Chrysanthemum, or mum, a plant
 Bamum kingdom or Mum, Cameroon
 Mum, Burma, a village in Burma
 Mum language, a language spoken in Papua New Guinea
 Mum (deodorant)
 Brunswick Mum, a beer
 Chhatrapati Shivaji International Airport, Mumbai (IATA code: MUM)

See also
 Mums (disambiguation)
 Mumm, a French champagne producer
 Mom (disambiguation)
 Mummy (disambiguation)